The 1964 Montana State Bobcats football team was an American football team that represented Montana State College (now known as Montana State University) in the Big Sky Conference during the 1964 NCAA College Division football season. In its second season under head coach Jim Sweeney, the team compiled a 7–4 record (3–0 against Big Sky opponents), won the conference championship, and defeated Sacramento State in the Camellia Bowl.

Schedule

References

Montana State
Montana State Bobcats football seasons
Big Sky Conference football champion seasons
Montana State Bobcats football